The Central Research Institute for Dryland Agriculture orCRIDA is an institute under the Indian Council of Agricultural Research. It was formed in 1985 as the Project Directorate of the All India Coordinated Research Project for Dryland Agriculture. The institute was set up with the intention of undertaking agricultural research activities in areas that have low rainfall.

References

External links
 Central Research Institute for Dryland Agriculture

Research institutes in Hyderabad, India
Educational institutions established in 1985
Agricultural research institutes in India
1985 establishments in Andhra Pradesh